David Robert Bates (born 5 October 1996) is a Scottish footballer who plays as a defender for K.V. Mechelen. Bates has previously played for Raith Rovers, East Stirlingshire, Brechin City, Rangers, Hamburg, Cercle Brugge, Sheffield Wednesday and Aberdeen. He has been capped four times at full international level by the Scotland national team.

Club career

Raith Rovers
Born in Kirkcaldy, Bates began his career at his hometown club Raith Rovers. He was first included in a matchday squad on 21 September 2013, remaining an unused substitute in their 4–2 Scottish Championship home win over Alloa Athletic. He was again unused in 13 more league games and two Scottish Challenge Cup fixtures.

In January 2015, Bates was loaned to Scottish League Two team East Stirlingshire for the remainder of the campaign. He made his debut on 3 January, playing the full 90 minutes of a 3–0 loss at Berwick Rangers. Two weeks later, he received a straight red card in a 3–1 home defeat to Annan Athletic. He made 17 appearances in all for the Shire; in his last one he headed the first goal of his career as they finished the season with a 5–1 loss to Albion Rovers at Ochilview Park.

On 25 July 2015, Bates made his first appearance for Raith, playing the entirety of a 1–0 win at Cowdenbeath in the first round of the Challenge Cup. On 8 August, he played his first league game, a 3–0 win over Livingston at Stark's Park on the first day of the Championship season. On 11 September 2015, Bates moved on loan to Brechin City in Scottish League One until 12 December 2015.

Rangers
On 5 August 2016, Bates moved on a development loan to Rangers until January 2017. At the end of his loan, Bates moved on a permanent basis to Rangers. He made his debut for Rangers in a Scottish Premiership match against Kilmarnock on 6 April 2017, starting at centre-back. Bates made his European debut in the opening game of Rangers' 2017–18 season against Progrès Niederkorn on 29 June 2017.

Hamburger SV
On 12 April 2018, Hamburger SV announced the signing of Bates on a four-year contract after his contract expired with Rangers in the summer of 2018. By February 2019 he was described as a "favourite" at the club, having started in 13 of 20 Hamburg's league games. Football writer Daniel Busch commented that Bates "plays like a 'no-nonsense centre-back' and already has strong physical attributes. Having improved his passing so quickly, he will further improve and become a more rounded player". In May 2019, he suffered a ligament part rupture in his left ankle during the away game against SC Paderborn 07, effectively ending his season.

On 8 August 2019, Bates signed for Sheffield Wednesday on a season-long loan. After starting only one match in the Owls' 1-0 EFL Cup victory over Rotherham United, he suffered a hip flexor injury that ruled him out for an extended period.

On 7 August 2020, Bates signed a season-long loan for Cercle Brugge.

Aberdeen
Bates returned to Scotland in August 2021, signing a three-year contract with Aberdeen.

Mechelen
After one season with Aberdeen, Bates signed a three-year contract with Belgian club K.V. Mechelen on 1 September 2022.

International career
Bates was selected for the Scotland under-21 team in September 2018. He made four appearances for the under-21 team, all in the early part of the 2018–19 season. Bates was then called into the full Scotland squad in November 2018, and he made his international debut in a 4–0 win against Albania on 17 November.

Career statistics

International

References

External links
 
 

1996 births
Living people
Footballers from Kirkcaldy
Scottish footballers
Association football defenders
Raith Rovers F.C. players
East Stirlingshire F.C. players
Brechin City F.C. players
Rangers F.C. players
Scottish Professional Football League players
2. Bundesliga players
Scotland under-21 international footballers
Scotland international footballers
Hamburger SV players
Scottish expatriate footballers
Expatriate footballers in Germany
Sheffield Wednesday F.C. players
Aberdeen F.C. players
Cercle Brugge K.S.V. players
Expatriate footballers in Belgium
K.V. Mechelen players